ToTok is a messaging app developed by Giacomo Ziani. It was introduced in Abu Dhabi Global Market economic free zone. According to The New York Times, it is also a mass surveillance tool of the United Arab Emirates intelligence services, used to gather private information on users' phones. The Timess reporting, denied by the app's developers, caused Google and Apple to remove the app in December 2019.

Features and development 
The ToTok app offers free messaging, voice calls and video calls. Conference calls involving up to 20 people can also be made. According to The New York Times, the app appears to be a slightly-customized copy of YeeCall, a Chinese messaging app.

Popularity
Introduced in 2019, it soon found a wide user base in the Emirates. Its spread was aided by the fact that the Emirati government blocks certain functions of other messaging services such as Skype and WhatsApp, and was apparently the first Voice over IP app to gain regulatory approval. The app was also promoted by state-linked Emirati publications and by the Chinese telecommunications company Huawei. That ToTok appeared to not be affiliated with a powerful country may also have helped its popularity in the Middle East. In December 2019, BotIM, a subscription-based messaging app, sent its users a message recommending ToTok for free messaging and calls. 

As of December 2019, ToTok was among the most-used 50 free apps in several countries including Saudi Arabia, the United Kingdom, India and Sweden. , the app had 7.9 million downloads between the iOS App Store and Google Play, with nearly two million daily users.

Surveillance tool reports
On 22 December 2019, The New York Times reported that U.S. intelligence assessments and the paper's own investigations showed that ToTok was used by Emirati intelligence to gather all conversations, movements, relationships, appointments, sounds and images by the app's users. The app does not use exploits, backdoors or malware. Instead, it gives the government access to the information shared through the app, as well as to other information on the smartphone that the government can access through permissions granted by users in order to enable the app's features.

According to the Times, the company behind ToTok, Breej Holding, is a front company of DarkMatter, an Emirati intelligence company under FBI investigation for cybercrimes. The Times also linked ToTok to Pax AI, an Emirati data mining firm tied to DarkMatter and located in the same building as the Emirates' Signals Intelligence Agency.

Breej Holding denied that its app was a spy tool, writing that its users "have the complete control over what data they want to share at their own discretion. The shameless fabrication by our distractors cannot be further from the truth." The Emirati telecommunications agency issued a statement that emphasized what it said were the country's strict privacy laws, but did not directly address the Timess reporting. The local Khaleej Times interviewed the "ToTok co-founder" Giacomo Ziani, who confirmed that he bought YeeCall's code, but also denied that his app was a government surveillance tool.

In response to the Timess inquiries, Google and Apple removed ToTok from their respective app stores on 19 and 20 December. The app re-appeared on Google Play on 3 January 2020, and disappeared again on 15 February 2020.

See also 
 Cyber spying

References

Further reading 
 

2019 software
2019 controversies
Android (operating system) software
IOS software
Emirati inventions
Instant messaging clients
Surveillance scandals
Telecommunications in the United Arab Emirates
VoIP software